III Internatsional is a rural locality (a settlement) in Andreyevsky Selsoviet of Bagansky District, Russia. The population was 44 as of 2010.

Streets 
 Tsentralnaya

Geography 
III Internatsional is located 54 km southwest of Bagan (the district's administrative centre) by road. Saratovka and Rayonnaya are the nearest rural localities.

References

External links 
 III Internatsional on komandirovka.ru

Rural localities in Novosibirsk Oblast